Hussein Bey al-Husayni (died 1918) was a Palestinian politician who served as mayor of Jerusalem from 1909 to 1917, the last years of Ottoman rule  over the city.

Born into the prominent Jerusalemite Arab family of al-Husayni, his father Salim al-Husayni had also served as mayor of the city.

Under Hussein's leadership, the city went through high development; al-Husayni initiated the paving of roads, which ensured cleaner streets, and started construction of a sewage network, which was partly financed by Jewish communities from outside Palestine. In an interview with the Egyptian newspaper Al-Iqdam in March 1914, he stressed the distinction between Zionism, which did not threaten Palestine, and he believed to be the real risk to the local Arab community from the Jewish settlers movement; and the subsequent necessity to prevent land sales to Jews. Al-Husayni also served as Director of the Red Crescent Society, established in 1915 and promoted Arab-Jewish understanding.
 

He helped foster Muslim, Jewish and Christian cooperation in an attempt to create a "post-Ottoman" alternative. On 9 December 1917, after the Allied forces led by General Allenby had forced the Ottoman defenders out of the city, al-Husayni formally surrendered Jerusalem to the British Military Administration. He signed an official decree of surrender a few days later, handing the keys of the city gates to Allenby. A couple of weeks after the surrender in January 1918, he died. After a brief term by Aref al-Dajani, Hussein's brother Musa al-Husayni became mayor of Jerusalem.

References

1918 deaths
Arabs in Ottoman Palestine
Mayors of Jerusalem
Palestinian politicians
Hussein
Year of birth missing
20th-century Palestinian people
19th-century Arabs